Late Night Tales: Midlake is a mix album compiled by folk rock band Midlake and released through Late Night Stories on March 28, 2011. The album is the 23rd in the Late Night Tales series.

Midlake's Late Night Tales selection '"tracks the fringes where disparate strains of art-rock, folk and folk-rock rub up against each other...an intriguing blend of old and new, with antique obscurities by such as Jimmie Spheeris and Bob Carpenter alongside more recent cuts from the likes of Espers and Björk." Their compilation features tracks from artists such as Fairport Convention, Steeleye Span, Björk, Espers, and Vashti Bunyan. It also features an exclusive in Midlake's cover of the Black Sabbath song "Am I Going Insane" off their 1975 album Sabotage.

Track listing

References

External links 
Official Midlake site
Official Midlake Late Night Tales Page

Midlake albums
2011 compilation albums